Boersma is a West Frisian occupational surname meaning "farmer('s son)". In 2007 6916 people in the Netherlands carried the name. Variant forms are Boorsma, Boerema, Boerma, Boersema. People with the name include:

Age Hains Boersma (b. 1982), Dutch football striker
Cintha Boersma (b. 1969), Dutch volleyball player
Emiel Boersma (b. 1980), Dutch volleyball player
 (b. 1935), Dutch actress
Francisco VanderHoff Boersma (b. 1939), Dutch missionary who cofounded the Fairtrade label in Latin America
 (b. 1976), Dutch painter
Hans Boersma (b. 1961), Dutch-American theologian
Jaap Boersma (1929–2012), Dutch politician
Jan Boersma (b. 1968), Dutch sailboarder
Jay W. Boersma (b. 1947), American photographer, designer, and creative director
Johannes Boersma (1937–2004), Dutch mathematician
Johannes Sipko Boersma (b. 1935), Dutch archaeologist
P. Dee Boersma (b. 1946), American conservation biologist
Paul Boersma (b. 1959), Dutch phonetician
Phil Boersma (b. 1949), English footballer
Tjeerd Boersma (1915–1985), Dutch sprinter
Boerma
Addeke Hendrik Boerma (1912–1992), Dutch civil servant, first director of the UN World Food Programme
Anthonius Cornelis Boerma (1852–1908), Dutch architect
 (b. 1970), Dutch snowboarder
Scott Boerma (b. 1964), American contemporary classical composer
Thomas Boerma (b. 1981), Dutch field hockey player
Boorsma
Alie Boorsma (b. 1959), Dutch speed skater
Tessa Boersma (b. 1993), Australian masterchef contestant and fan favourite.

References

Surnames of Frisian origin
Occupational surnames